A ribosome-inactivating protein (RIP) is a protein synthesis inhibitor that acts at the eukaryotic ribosome. This protein family describes a large family of such proteins that work by acting as rRNA N-glycosylase (EC 3.2.2.22). They inactivate 60S ribosomal subunits by an N-glycosidic cleavage, which releases a specific adenine base from the sugar-phosphate backbone of 28S rRNA. RIPs exist in bacteria and plants.

Members of the family include shiga toxins, and type I (e.g. trichosanthin and luffin) and type II (e.g. ricin, agglutinin, and abrin) ribosome inactivating proteins (RIPs). All these toxins are structurally related. RIPs have been of considerable interest because of their potential use, conjugated with monoclonal antibodies, as immunotoxins to treat cancers. Further, trichosanthin has been shown to have potent activity against HIV-1-infected T cells and macrophages. Elucidation of the structure-function relationships of RIPs has therefore become a major research effort. It is now known that RIPs are structurally related. A conserved glutamic residue has been implicated in the catalytic mechanism; this lies near a conserved arginine, which also plays a role in catalysis.

Only a minority of RIPs are toxic to humans when consumed, and proteins of this family are found in the vast majority of plants used for human consumption, such as Rice, Maize and Barley. In plants, they are thought to defend against pathogens and insects.

Ribosome-inactivating proteins (RIPs) are separated into the following types based on protein domain composition:

 Type I (A): RIPs-I are polypeptides composed of an A domain. This is the site of N-glycosidase activity.
 Type II (AB): RIPs-II are composed of an A domain with similar catalytic activity to Type I RIPs, and a B domain with carbohydrate-binding (lectin) properties. The B domain is able to bind galactosyl moieties on the cell surface which facilitates entry into the cell, thus making Type II particularly cytotoxic. The A and B domains are fused together by disulfide bonds. This group excludes bacterial AB5 toxins such as Shiga toxin, as the carbohydrate-binding ability evolved separately and these toxins are more similar to type I RIPs.
 Type III: RIPs-III are separated into two subgroups. One subgroup (AC) contains the same original RIP domain (A), and a C-terminal with unknown functionality. The other subgroup (AD) is similar to Type I, but contains a site for inactivation.

Examples include:
Abrin
Beetin
Ricin
Saporin
Shiga toxin
A Spiroplasma toxin
Trichosanthin
Viscumin (European mistletoe)
Pokeweed antiviral protein (Phytolacca americana)

References 

 
Protein domains